Blanca Estrada (born 1950) is a Spanish retired actress and presenter best known for her roles throughout the 1970s and 1980s in 20 films classified as .

Biography
The next year she went to work as a presenter of the Valerio Lazarov variety show 

Her subsequent cinematic career focused on a series of films of high erotic content, among which stand out Una vela para el diablo (1973), El libro de buen amor (1975, with Patxi Andión, considered by Ya newspaper film critic Pascual Cebollada as "a broad sample of masculine and feminine nudity, in front and behind, and a constant tension or demonstration of eroticism illustrated with obscenities"), Metralleta Stein (1975), Dios bendiga cada rincón de esta casa (1977, with Lola Gaos, based on the novel Cousin Bazilio by Eça de Queirós), El francotirador (1977),  (1979), and The Cantabrians (1980), in which the young star had frequent nude and "bed scenes", which made her one of the most celebrated actresses of the moment.

She also went "a little undressed" in many magazines such as Play-Lady, "where she appeared in vivid leathers," , Interviú, and especially Fotogramas, which she was on the cover of five times in the mid-70s.

At the end of 1976, Estrada took part in the chapter of the Antonio Gala series  dedicated to Mariana Pineda, broadcast by Televisión Española on 13 December.

Separated from Luis Bastarrica, whom she married in 1970, she has had two romantic relationships, with the Radio Nacional de España broadcaster Joaquín Ocio, who died in 1994, and the journalist , who disappeared in 2008 at age 71.

After living for a while in the United States, Estrada currently resides in Málaga, completely away from the artistic world.

Filmography

Films

Television

References

External links
 

1950 births
20th-century Spanish actresses
Actors from Asturias
Living people
People from Langreo
Spanish film actresses
Spanish television actresses
Spanish television presenters
Spanish women television presenters